Microbacterium lindanitolerans is a Gram-positive, aerobic and rod-shaped bacterium from the genus Microbacterium which has been isolated from soil which was contaminated with hexachlorocyclohexane in India.

References

Further reading

External links
Type strain of Microbacterium lindanitolerans at BacDive -  the Bacterial Diversity Metadatabase	

Bacteria described in 2010
lindanitolerans